Desdemona is a play by Toni Morrison. It was first produced in Vienna in May 2011. The title character of the play is Desdemona, the wife of the title character in Shakespeare's Othello. The 2011 play arose from a collaboration between Morrison, director Peter Sellars, and musician Rokia Traoré. About a decade earlier, Morrison and Sellars had disagreed about Shakespeare’s play, which Sellars detested but Morrison valued. They agreed that Sellars would stage “Othello” and Morrison would respond to in another way, resulting in her Desdemona. 

The play revolves around Desdemona's relationship with the nurse who raised her, "Barbara" in Shakespeare but "Barbary" in Morrison's work. She is envisioned as an African woman, suggested by the  name "Barbary" being not only a familiar variant of the name but a reference to northern Africa (the "Barbary coast") in Shakespeare's day. This also gives Desdemona an emotional connection with African people dating back to her childhood.

Morrison's play marks the third major play focusing on Shakespeare's Desdemona composed by a modern female playwright, following Desdemona: A Play about a Handkerchief (1993) by Paula Vogel, and Goodnight Desdemona (Good Morning Juliet) (1988) by Ann-Marie MacDonald. All three plays have highly divergent interpretations of the character of Desdemona.

The official playscript of Desdemona was published in 2012 by Oberon Books, with a foreword written by the director Peter Sellars.

Performances
 May 15, 17-21, 2011 - Theater Akzent - Vienna, Austria
 May 26–29, 2011 - Theatre Royal Flamand (KVS) - Brussels, Belgium
 October 13–21, 2011 - Nanterre-Amandiers theatre, Nanterre, France
 October 26–29, 2011 - Zellerbach Playhouse, Berkeley, United States
 November 2–3, 2011 - Rose Theater - New York, United States
 November 10–12, 2011 - Haus der Berliner Festspiele - Berlin, Germany
 July 2012 - Barbican Centre - London, England
 June 11–13, 2013 - Holland Festival, Amsterdam, The Netherlands
 November 2013 - Edna Manley College of the Visual and Performing Arts: School of Drama - Kingston, Jamaica
 October 8–11, 2015 - UCLA's Freud Playhouse, Los Angeles, United States
 October 16–19, 2015 - Southbank Theatre, Melbourne, Australia
 April 16, 2019 - Sanders Theater, Cambridge, MA

References

2011 plays
Plays and musicals based on Othello
Works by Toni Morrison